Robert Pomie Ballet was a series of ballets broadcast by the ABC in 1963 choreographed by Robert Pomie and directed by Christopher Muir.

They included:
The Web
Le Bal del Tutus
The Fir Tree

References

Australian television plays
Australian television plays based on ballets